Shankarrao Ramachandra Godambe (1 March 1899 – 6 December 1969) was an Indian cricketer who played first-class cricket from 1920 to 1941.

Godambe was a medium-pace seam bowler and useful late-order batsman who had a long career for the Hindus in the Bombay Quadrangular. After doing well in the trial matches in 1931-32 he was selected to tour England with India's first Test touring team in 1932. However, he was unable to make the most of his infrequent opportunities on tour and did not play in the Test match.

He scored 62 (his highest score) and 51 not out when the Hindus beat the Europeans in the final of the 1925-26 Bombay Quadrangular. His best bowling figures were 6 for 32, after taking 4 for 42 in the first innings, to help the Hindus to victory over the Parsees in the 1929–30 final.

References

External links
 

1899 births
1969 deaths
Indian cricketers
Hindus cricketers
Mumbai cricketers
Gujarat cricketers
Cricketers from Mumbai